Lanteglos may refer to:

Lanteglos-by-Camelford, a hamlet and ecclesiastical parish in north Cornwall in the UK
Lanteglos-by-Fowey, a civil parish in south-east Cornwall in the UK